Jeff Day may refer to:

an episode of Rules of Engagement (season 5)
an episode of New Girl (season 5)